The 2016 Philippine Futsal League is the fifth season of the Philippine Futsal League. It was held at the Enderun Colleges.

Men's division

Women's division

Futsal in the Philippines